Tiffany Cabán (born July 24, 1987) is an American attorney, politician, and political organizer who has served as a member of the New York City Council for the 22nd District since the 2021 New York City Council election. She won the Democratic primary for the seat after the incumbent, Democrat Costa Constantinides, retired.

She was a candidate in the 2019 Democratic primary for Queens County's District Attorney in the State of New York, which she narrowly lost to Queens Borough president Melinda Katz.

Early life and education 

Cabán was born in Richmond Hill, Queens, to Puerto Rican parents: an elevator mechanic father and a children's caretaker mother; both had been raised in NYCHA's Woodside Houses. She attended PS 62 and JHS 210 before attending St. Francis Preparatory School. She earned a Bachelor of Arts degree from Pennsylvania State University, where she majored in studies of crime, law, and justice. Subsequently, she earned a Juris Doctor degree from New York Law School.

Career 
Cabán was a public defender, who worked for New York County Defender Services and the Legal Aid Society.

Queens District Attorney campaign 
Cabán's 2019 campaign for Queens County District Attorney focused on criminal justice reform, including ending mass incarceration and the War on Drugs. She also called for the decriminalization of sex work. Cabán was endorsed by The New York Times, as well as progressive politicians such as Alexandria Ocasio-Cortez, Bernie Sanders, Elizabeth Warren, and Larry Krasner, as well as several progressive members of the New York State Legislature and Suffolk County, Massachusetts DA Rachael Rollins. The race drew national attention, drawing comparisons to Ocasio-Cortez's upset victory in the 2018 House primary election over Joe Crowley.

Numerous progressive political organizations also endorsed her campaign, including Citizen Action of New York, the Working Families Party, the Democratic Socialists of America, Make the Road, Real Justice, and other community organizations in New York.

Cabán faced Queens borough president Melinda Katz in the Democratic primary. The previous District Attorney, Richard Brown, had intended to retire after the election, but died in office shortly before the primary. On June 25, 2019, Cabán claimed victory over Katz, but with the margin of victory standing at just over one percentage point, Katz declined to concede the election. On July 3, election officials said Katz pulled ahead in the final count with a lead of just 20 votes, triggering a recount. On August 6, days after Katz was declared the ultimate victor by 60 votes, Cabán conceded the race.

Post-election work
After her campaign for District Attorney, Cabán took on a role as a national political organizer with the Working Families Party. She was focused on recruiting decarceral criminal justice reformers to run for office.

New York City Council 
In September 2020, Cabán announced her candidacy for the 22nd district of the New York City Council in the 2021 election. The incumbent Costa Constantinides could not seek re-election due to term limits. New York City's 22nd district covers Ditmars, Steinway, Astoria, Queens and parts of East Elmhurst, Queens.

Cabán was sworn in on December 1, 2021 following her election on November 2, in order to fill the vacancy left by Constantinides' resignation.

In 2022, Cabán supported a proposed rezoning to allow a 1300-unit housing development (one quarter of which was earmarked for affordable housing) on a former industrial site in her district.

Personal life 
Cabán lives in Astoria, Queens and identifies as queer.

References

External links 

Campaign website

1987 births
21st-century American women politicians
21st-century American politicians
Puerto Rican people in New York (state) politics
American politicians of Puerto Rican descent
Hispanic and Latino American politicians
Hispanic and Latino American women in politics
American women lawyers
Lawyers from New York City
LGBT Hispanic and Latino American people
LGBT people from New York (state)
Living people
Democratic Socialists of America politicians from New York
New York (state) socialists
New York (state) Democrats
People from Queens, New York
Queer women
Prison abolitionists
Police abolitionists
American LGBT city council members
Women New York City Council members
New York City Council members
Public defenders